The men's 50 kilometres race walk at the 1974 European Athletics Championships was held in Rome, Italy, on 7 September 1974.

Medalists

Results

Final
7 September

Participation
According to an unofficial count, 19 athletes from 8 countries participated in the event.

 (1)
 (1)
 (3)
 (3)
 (3)
 (3)
 (2)
 (3)

References

50 kilometres race walk
Racewalking at the European Athletics Championships